Amazon Fire TV (stylized as amazon fireTV) is a line of digital media players and microconsoles developed by Amazon. The devices are small network appliances that deliver digital audio and video content streamed via the Internet to a connected high-definition television. They also allow users to access local content and to play video games with the included remote control or another game controller, or by using a mobile app remote control on another device.

The device is available in two form factors, set-top box and HDMI plug-in stick with, in general, lesser specifications than the contemporaneous boxes. The current set-top box model is the Fire TV Cube with embedded Amazon Echo smart speaker (which effectively replaced the Fire TV box model), while the stick form factor encompasses four models, the entry-level Fire TV Stick Lite, the standard Fire TV Stick, and the high-end Fire TV Stick 4K and Fire TV Stick 4K Max (the last of which effectively replaced the third-generation Fire TV with 4K Ultra HD "pendant").

The first-generation Fire TV device was unveiled on April 2, 2014. The second-generation version was released in 2015, with additional Fire TV devices released on regular basis since.

In March 2016, Amazon began collaborating with television set manufacturers to include the Amazon Fire OS and Fire TV interface built-in with televisions sold to the public, labeled as Fire TV Edition. In September 2018, Amazon extended the use of the Fire TV brand to the Fire TV Recast, an over-the-air television digital video recorder exclusively for viewing use with Fire TV and Amazon Echo Show devices, which it discontinued in August 2022.

Fire TV hardware

Original model

First generation 

The first Fire TV was made available for purchase in the US on the same day of the April 2014 announcement for US$99 and was launched with a video game called Sev Zero. Codenamed "Bueller", after the eponymous character from Ferris Bueller's Day Off, it offered HDMI audio, with support for Dolby Digital Plus 7.1 surround sound pass-through, if the user's Internet bandwidth was sufficient. According to Amazon, the Fire TV was designed to outpace competitors like the Apple TV and Roku in performance: the 0.72-inch-thick box featured a 1.7 GHz quad-core CPU (Qualcomm Snapdragon 8064), 2 GB of RAM and 8 GB of internal storage, along with a MIMO dual-band radio for 1080p streaming over 802.11a/b/g/n Wi-Fi and a 10/100 Ethernet connection and USB 2.0 port. Included with the box is a Bluetooth remote control with a microphone for voice search.

The company said that it did not intend the Fire TV to compete with gaming consoles; instead, its gaming capabilities were geared toward people who did not already own a console but may play games on a smartphone or tablet. It has a dedicated controller accessory.

Second generation 
Amazon released a second-generation Fire TV, codenamed "Sloane", after the film love interest of Ferris Bueller, in late 2015. This version had 4K resolution support, improved processor performance, and a MediaTek 8173C chipset to support H.265 (HEVC), VP8, and VP9 codecs. Wireless hardware upgrades included 4K capable, a dual-band 802.11a/b/g/n/ac Wi-Fi with 2x2 MIMO and Bluetooth 4.1. It was effectively replaced with the Fire TV Cube.

Third generation 
The third-generation Fire TV, also known as the Fire TV with 4K Ultra HD and Alexa Voice Remote, was released in 2017. It eschewed the previous set-top box design for a small, diamond-shaped "pendant" reminiscent of the Fire TV Stick, which plugs directly into a television set's HDMI port and can be hung from a short HDMI extender cable. It contained a slower processor but more RAM than the second-generation Fire TV, and also had support for 4K resolution streaming, Dolby Atmos, and HDR10. Production was discontinued in 2018 in favor of the Fire TV Stick 4K.

Fire TV Cube 
Fire TV Cube is the first streaming media player to support Wi-Fi 6E. It has16GB of internal storage and it supports Bluetooth 5.0, its processor is octa-core. This device has two HDMI ports, an IR extender port, USB-A port and power port. Moreover, It has an Ethernet port, which supports the speed of 100mbps, fire tv cube has a different remote having more buttons for better performance and an improved user experience (UX)..

First generation 

The Fire TV Cube was released in June 2018. It is similar in function to the third-generation Fire TV but also includes embedded Alexa functionality similar to the Amazon Echo smart speaker line and can use HDMI-CEC and an IR blaster to control other devices with voice commands. As its voice functionality is integrated into the device, the Fire TV Cube does not include the voice remote. The device uses a 1.5 GHz quad-core ARM 4xCA53 processor, 2 GB RAM, and 16 GB storage.

Second generation 

A second-generation model was unveiled in September 2019, featuring a hexa-core processor, "Local Voice Control" (which allows client-side recognition of common voice commands to improve response time), and support for Dolby Vision and HDR10+. It supports 4K output.

Third generation 

A third-generation model of the Fire TV Cube was announced on September 28, 2022 for release on October 25, 2022. Notable upgrades to the 3rd-generation model include an octa-core processor (4x 2.2GHz 4x 2.0GHz), support for 6e Ethernet/Wi-Fi networking, and Bluetooth 5.0+LE.

Fire TV Stick 
In addition to Fire TV, there is Fire TV Stick. which served as the brand's Start Basic model's name. which functions flawlessly on Fire OS. There is no setup box included. Its design is distinctive, small, and simple to connect. Following its success, the business updated it and released it under a new name. The Fire TV Stick comes in a variety of models, including the Fire TV Stick Lite, Fire TV Stick 4K, and Fire TV Stick 4K Max. Starting with the Lite version, pricing and feature count increase, with the 4K Max representing the fully optioned flagship of the range, sporting a  premium pricetag as well

First generation 
On November 19, 2014, Amazon released its Fire TV Stick, a smaller dongle version of the Fire TV that plugs into an HDMI port. Codenamed "Montoya", it retains much of the functionality of the larger Fire TV. It has 1 GB of RAM, 8 GB of internal storage, weighs , and it uses a Broadcom BCM28155 1.0 GHz Cortex-A9 processor and a Broadcom VideoCore IV GPU. Wireless hardware includes a dual-band 802.11 a/b/g/n Wi-Fi with 2x2 MIMO and Bluetooth 3.0   The Fire TV Stick is bundled with a remote control, in either of two variants: one with Alexa voice search and one without Alexa.

Second generation 

On October 20, 2016, Amazon released the Fire TV Stick with Alexa Voice Remote, codenamed "Tank". Other than the new remote, the updates include MediaTek MT8127D Quad-core ARM 1.3 GHz processor with a Mali-450 MP4 GPU, and support for the H.265 (HEVC) codec. Wireless hardware upgrades includes a dual-band 802.11a/b/g/n/ac Wi-Fi with 2x2 MIMO and Bluetooth 4.1.

In January 2019, the second-generation Fire TV Stick was re-issued with the updated remote from the 4K model.

Fire TV Stick 4K 
In October 2018, Amazon unveiled the Fire TV Stick 4K, codenamed "Mantis," which "effectively replaces Amazon’s Fire TV pendant." It is upgraded to a 1.7 GHz quad-core processor and supports 4K output, HDR10+ and Dolby Vision, Dolby Atmos, and hardware-accelerated MPEG-2 decoding. It also includes an updated voice remote that contains an infrared emitter and buttons for controlling TV power and volume (which can also be controlled with voice commands). The remote is backward compatible with previous Fire TV models, and also sold separately as an upgrade.

Third generation 
In October 2020, two third-generation Fire TV Stick models were released. The Fire TV Stick model includes a remote with TV control buttons where the Fire TV Stick Lite model's remote does not include TV controls. Both models include similar internal hardware as the Fire TV Stick 4K, except for a maximum output resolution of 1080p and only 1 GB of RAM.
In 2021, the third-generation Fire TV Stick was re-issued with an updated remote "3rd Gen Alexa Voice Remote".

Fire TV Stick 4K Max 
On October 7, 2021, Amazon released the Fire TV Stick 4K Max. It includes the updated 3rd gen Alexa Voice Remote, and has Wi-Fi 6 support. It has a 1.8 GHz processor, a 750 MHz GPU, and 2 GB of RAM. It also has Dolby Atmos support. This Fire TV is the first in the line with hardware accelerated AV1 support.

Fire TV Edition 
Fire TV Edition is the product name applied to smart television sets produced by major television manufacturers that include Amazon Fire OS and the Fire TV interface, licensed from Amazon. They offer basic live television program information and minimal recording capabilities. Fire TV Edition television models are available from Best Buy's house brand Insignia, Toshiba (in U.S. and Canadian markets), and JVC and Grundig (in European markets).

Fire TV Recast 
The Fire TV Recast was a digital video recorder that worked with an over-the-air antenna to record shows for later viewing on a Fire TV or an Amazon Echo Show device. It was designed for use with over-the-air TV services and was a part of the cord-cutting movement. It was announced in September 2018.

Content stored on a Recast could not be viewed using other major streaming devices, such as Roku, Apple TV, or Chromecast, limiting its appeal. The Recast also never gained the ability to skip commercials during playback.

In August 2022, Amazon confirmed the discontinuation of the Fire TV Recast.

Software 

The Fire TV series runs Fire OS, which is derived from Android Open Source Project source code. It supports voice commands via either a remote control with an embedded microphone, or integrated microphones inside the device (as is the case of the Fire TV Cube), and can also be controlled with Alexa via Amazon Echo smart speakers. The devices support various Amazon-owned services, including Amazon Prime Video, Twitch, Amazon Freevee, Amazon Music and Amazon Luna, as well as other major third-party services, including Netflix, YouTube, YouTube TV, Curiosity Stream, Mubi, Dekkoo, Ameba TV, YuppTV, Chorki, Eros Now, the Apple TV app, ZEE5, Crunchyroll, Crackle, DAZN, Dailymotion, Peacock, Hulu, Hotstar, Disney+, Tubi, Vimeo, HBO Max, Discovery+, Joyn, Philo, Paramount+, Pluto TV, FuboTV, WOW Presents Plus, MX Player, Spotify, TuneIn, iHeartRadio, Tidal, Audacy, BBC Sounds, Qello, Plex, Emby, Jellyfin, AirConsole and others via Amazon Appstore.

The "X-Ray" feature allows users to view contextual information related to Prime Video content (such as biographies of actors and other trivia), using face recognition, music recognition, and IMDb data.

Updates 

Updating Amazon Firestick is not necessary. Firestick comes with auto-update notifications from Amazon. Or check the System update option in the About section of Settings. Fire OS software updates are required to fix some problems like Firestick lagging, slow, and crashes. To update the software strong internet connection is required.

Models

Reception 
Dan Seifert from The Verge reviewed Fire TV on April 4, 2014, giving it an 8.8/10 rating and largely praising its functionality and future potential. Dave Smith from ReadWrite wrote, "Fire TV aims to be the cure for what ails TV set-top boxes." GeekWire editor Andy Liu's review is headlined "Amazon's Fire TV sets a new bar for streaming boxes."
Ars Technica praised the device for specifications that surpassed competitors, good build quality, and a microphone works very well if you use Amazon content. The reviewer disliked the fact that its media browser puts Amazon content in the front, which makes other applications less convenient to use, limited game selection with many games not optimized, and only 5.16GB of free space, which limits the number of games that can be installed.

Main competitors 
Some notable competitors include Roku, Apple TV, Nvidia Shield TV and Chromecast.

See also 
 Amazon
 Comparison of digital media players
 Smart TV

References

External links
 

Fire TV
Products introduced in 2014
Streaming media systems
Networking hardware
Digital media players
Microconsoles
Android-based video game consoles
ARM-based video game consoles
Eighth-generation video game consoles
Smart TV
Operating systems based on the Linux kernel